Marcus Madugu Dogo is an Anglican bishop in Nigeria: formerly an  Archdeacon, since 2011 he has been the Bishop of Kafanchan, one of seventeen dioceses within the Anglican Province of Abuja, itself one of 14 provinces within the Church of Nigeria.

Notes

Living people
Anglican bishops of Kafanchan
21st-century Anglican bishops in Nigeria
Year of birth missing (living people)
Church of Nigeria archdeacons